is a Japanese color designer and colorist.

Career
Watanabe started her career in the anime industry in 2000 as a digital colorist with Shaft. Much of her early work consisted of doing the coloring for outsources given to Shaft, before gradually shifting into in-house production as Shaft itself shifted to in-house production. In 2004, Shaft split its digital coloring and compositing teams into their own department, Digital@Shaft, which Watanabe became a part of. Her first work as a color designer was also an outsource, however: Shattered Angels, which was produced by studio TNK, contacted Shaft for color design work, and both she and her senior (Hitoshi Hibino) did the color designs for the show. It wasn't until seven years later, in 2014, that she made her debut as a color designer in-house at Shaft with Hanamonogatari (with Hibino). The following year, she made her debut as solo color designer on Gourmet Girl Graffiti.

In 2022, Shaft opened a new studio in Shizuoka Prefecture with the hopes of expanding the company's production capacity outside of Tokyo. In order to set up operations and train new staff, several members of the main Tokyo branch would need to transfer to Shizuoka to perform these duties. Shaft's CEO, Mitsutoshi Kubota, offered Watanabe the opportunity and, despite having never lived in Shizuoka Prefecture, she agreed to the transfer and became a studio chief.

Works
This is an incomplete list.

Teleivison series

OVAs/ONAs

References

Further reading

External links

People from Akita Prefecture
Living people